Mark Nicholas Davies (born 28 December 1959) is a former Welsh cricketer. Davies was a left-handed batsman who bowled occasional right-arm off break. He was born at Maesteg, Glamorgan.

Davies made his first-class debut for Glamorgan against Oxford University in 1982 at St. Helen's following a good record in club cricket with Maesteg Celtic and for the Glamorgan Second XI. He played forty-seven games for the Glamorgan Second XI, as well as nine invitational First XI and Second XI matches, and sixteen games for Under-25 team.

Batting once during his debut first-class match, Davies was dismissed for a duck, in what was to be his only innings at first-class level, by Timothy Taylor. He made a second first-class appearance in that season's County Championship against Worcestershire at Sophia Gardens, with the match largely washed out by rain.

References

External links
Mark Davies at ESPNcricinfo
Mark Davies at CricketArchive

1959 births
Living people
Sportspeople from Maesteg
Welsh cricketers
Glamorgan cricketers